Chaplinsky v. New Hampshire, 315 U.S. 568 (1942), was a landmark decision of the US Supreme Court in which the Court articulated the fighting words doctrine, a limitation of the First Amendment's guarantee of freedom of speech.

Background 
On April 6, 1940, Walter Chaplinsky, a Jehovah's Witness, was using the public sidewalk as a pulpit in downtown Rochester, passing out pamphlets and calling organized religion a "racket". After a large crowd had begun blocking the roads and generally causing a scene, a police officer removed Chaplinsky to take him to police headquarters. Upon seeing the town marshal (who had returned to the scene after warning Chaplinsky earlier to keep it down and avoid causing a commotion), Chaplinsky attacked the marshal verbally. He was then arrested. The complaint against Chaplinsky stated that he shouted: "You are a God-damned racketeer" and "a damned Fascist". Chaplinsky admitted that he said the words charged in the complaint, with the exception of "God".

For this, he was charged and convicted under a New Hampshire statute forbidding intentionally offensive speech directed at others in a public place. Under New Hampshire's Offensive Conduct law (chap. 378, para. 2 of the NH. Public Laws) it is illegal for anyone to address "any offensive, derisive or annoying word to anyone who is lawfully in any street or public place ... or to call him by an offensive or derisive name."

Chaplinsky appealed the fine he was assessed, claiming that the law was "vague" and that it infringed upon his First Amendment and Fourteenth Amendment rights to free speech.

Alternate views 
Some modern legal historians have disputed the generally accepted version of events that led to Chaplinsky's arrest.

Columbia Law School professor Vincent Blasi's article on the topic describes the events thus: while preaching, Chaplinsky was surrounded by men who mocked Jehovah's Witnesses' objections to saluting the flag. One man attempted to hit Chaplinsky in full view of the town marshal, who warned Chaplinsky that he was in danger but did not arrest his assailant. After the marshal left, another man produced a flagpole and attempted to impale Chaplinsky; while Chaplinsky was pinned against a car by the pole, other members of the crowd struck him. A police officer arrived and, rather than dispersing the crowd, took Chaplinsky into custody.

En route to the station, the officer, as well as members of the crowd, insulted Chaplinsky and his religion.  Chaplinsky responded by calling the town marshal, who had returned to assist the officer, a "damn fascist and a racketeer" and was arrested for the use of offensive language in public.

Opinion of the Court 
The Court, in a unanimous decision, upheld the arrest. Writing the decision for the Court, Justice Frank Murphy advanced a "two-tier theory" of the First Amendment. Certain "well-defined and narrowly limited" categories of speech fall outside the bounds of constitutional protection. Thus, "the lewd and obscene, the profane, the slanderous", and (in this case) insulting or "fighting" words neither contributed to the expression of ideas nor possessed any "social value" in the search for truth.

Murphy wrote:
There are certain well-defined and narrowly limited classes of speech,  the prevention and punishment of which have never been thought to raise any constitutional problem. These include the lewd and obscene, the profane, the libelous, and the insulting or "fighting" words those which by their very utterance inflict injury or tend to incite an immediate breach of the peace. It has been well observed that such utterances are no essential part of any exposition of ideas, and are of such slight social value as a step to truth that any benefit that may be derived from them is clearly outweighed by the social interest in order and morality.

Subsequent case law 
Subsequent cases, in the Supreme Court, lower federal courts, and state courts have reached diverse conclusions on what constitute fighting words that are outside the protection of the First Amendment. The cases have also varied on what contexts – such as the reaction of hearers (public officials, police officers, ordinary citizens) – make a difference for the limits on protected speech. A particularly provocative example occurred in Cohen v. California (1971) in which an individual was criminally charged for wearing, in a courthouse, a jacket on which was written "Fuck the Draft". The Supreme Court held that the Chaplinsky doctrine did not control this case, and overturned the conviction. The Court's opinion, by Justice John Marshall Harlan II, declared, "For while the particular four-letter word being litigated here is perhaps more distasteful than most others of its genre, it is nevertheless often true that one man's vulgarity is another's lyric."

A legal scholar, writing in 2003 over 60 years after the Chaplinsky decision, has noted that lower courts "have reached maddeningly inconsistent results" on what is and is not protected by the First Amendment in the area of fighting words.

See also 
Clear and present danger
Imminent lawless action
List of United States Supreme Court cases, volume 315
Shouting fire in a crowded theater
Threatening the president of the United States
Abrams v. United States, 
Brandenburg v. Ohio, 
Dennis v. United States, 
Feiner v. New York, 
Hess v. Indiana, 
Korematsu v. United States, 
Kunz v. New York, 
Masses Publishing Co. v. Patten, (1917)
Sacher v. United States,  
Schenck v. United States, 
Terminiello v. City of Chicago, 
Whitney v. California,

References

Further reading

External links 
 
 
 

1942 in United States case law
United States Supreme Court cases
United States Supreme Court cases of the Stone Court
United States Free Speech Clause case law
Jehovah's Witnesses litigation in the United States
Legal history of New Hampshire
Rochester, New Hampshire
Christianity and law in the 20th century